Theodora (Greek: Θεοδώρα;  50028 June 548) was a Byzantine empress through her marriage to emperor Justinian. She became empress upon Justinian's accession in 527 and was one of his chief advisers, albeit from humble origins. Along with her spouse, Theodora is a saint in the Eastern Orthodox Church and in the Oriental Orthodox Church, commemorated on 14 November and 28 June respectively.

Early years 
According to Michael the Syrian, her birthplace was in Mabbug, Syria; Nicephorus Callistus Xanthopoulos names Theodora a native of Cyprus, while the Patria, attributed to George Codinus, claims Theodora came from Paphlagonia. She was born c. AD 500. Her father, Acacius, was a bear trainer of the hippodrome's Green faction in Constantinople. Her mother, whose name is not recorded, was a dancer and an actress. Her parents had two more daughters, the eldest named Comito and the youngest Anastasia. After her father's death, her mother remarried quickly, but the family lacked a source of income, since her deceased father's position was given away due to a bribe paid to the head ballet dancer, Asterius, who owned the hiring decision. When Theodora was four, her mother initially brought her children wearing garlands into the Hippodrome and presented them as suppliants to the Green faction, but they rebuffed her efforts. Consequently, Theodora's mother approached the Blue faction. The Blues took pity on their family and gave the open position of bear keeper to Theodora's stepfather – saving them from destitution. From then on, Theodora would be their supporter.

According to Procopius' Secret History, Theodora followed her sister Comito's example from an early age and worked in a Constantinople brothel serving low and high status customers; later, she performed on stage. In his famous account of Theodora, itself based on Secret History, Edward Gibbon wrote:

Her venal charms were abandoned  to a promiscuous crowd of citizens and strangers of every rank, and of every position; the fortunate lover who had been promised a night of enjoyment, was often driven from her bed by a stronger or more wealthy favourite; and when she passed through the streets, her presence was avoided by all who wished to escape either the scandal or the temptation.

Theodora, in Procopius's account, made a name for herself with her salacious portrayal of Leda and the Swan. Employment as an actress at the time would include both "indecent exhibitions on stage" and providing sexual services off stage. To a certain extent, it is unclear how accurate the portrayal of Theodora's salacious behaviors on- and off the stage is since these stereotypical roles were ascribed to many female actresses and mime performers of the time. Some historians assert that those in power at the time likely delighted in these tales of misbehavior when Theodora became empress due to their fear of her power over the empire. Being able to see her painted in a negative light reassured those in hegemony that she did not represent a threat to them and the status quo. The detailed and pornographic descriptions of Theodora’s past life in the Secret History are perceived as slanderous and offensive by modern interpretation. However, some contemporary authors like John of Ephesus describe Theodora’s past with clarity as having come “from the brothel” with a more empathetic perspective. Consistent with the Christian principles of repentance and forgiveness, John sees her redemption as a positive tale. In fact, Procopius stands alone among contemporary writers of the time in his descriptive and aggressive depiction of her scurrilous past. The belief that a female using her body for political gain was considered to be an acceptable strategy and not a new one. Women doing so were considered to have agency similar to a man and were granted a voice by contemporary historians during both the Roman and Byzantine eras. This pattern has a historical context according to the historian Sandra Joshel, who described the Roman historian Tacitus’s coverage of the empress Messalina. Tacitus held her in similar disdain with his stories of her wanton sexual activities which lacked the nobility of gaining power. Like Tacitus’s historical coverage of Empress Messalina 500 years previous, Procopius only gave women a voice when their actions were perceived masculine in nature. The irony is that the palace uniquely held powerful women in two roles – a state role as empress and a household role as the spouse of the emperor. The empress served both roles simultaneously and the apparent power of the women behind the throne frustrated many a historian’s simplistic view of the nature of powerful women and their roles.  During this time, she may have met the future wife of Belisarius, Antonina, who would become a part of the women's court led by Theodora.

Later, Theodora traveled to North Africa as the concubine of a Syrian official named Hecebolus when he went to the Libyan Pentapolis as governor. Abandoned and maltreated by Hecebolus, on her way back to the capital of the Byzantine Empire, she settled for a while in Alexandria, Egypt.
She is speculated by some to have met Patriarch Timothy III in Alexandria, who was Miaphysite, and it may be at that time that she converted to Miaphysite Christianity. From Alexandria, she went to Antioch, where she met a Blue faction's dancer, Macedonia, who was perhaps an informer of Justinian.

When Justinian sought to marry Theodora, he was prevented by a Roman law from Constantine's time that barred anyone of senatorial rank from marrying actresses. In 524, Byzantine emperor Justin passed a new law, decreeing that reformed actresses could thereafter legally marry outside their rank if approved by the emperor. The same law stated that daughters of these actresses would also be free to marry a man of any rank, which would have allowed Theodora's illegitimate daughter (whose name has been lost) to marry one of the relatives of previous emperor Anastasius. Some sources claimed that she had an illegitimate son, John, as well but there seems to be little corroboration for that claim. Procopius described John as a young man who arrived in Constantinople, claiming that his father made a deathbed confession that John was the illegitimate son of Theodora who would have committed infanticide if the father had not removed him to safety. According to Procopius's account, when Theodora learned of his arrival and claims, she had him secretly sent away to an unknown location, never to be heard from again. According to classics scholar, James Allan Evans, this claim seems far-fetched since Theodora acknowledged her illegitimate daughter – why would she not claim her son as well?  This appears to be another example of Procopius and his followers seeking to delegitimize her stature and power. Soon after Justin's law was passed, Justinian married Theodora.

Empress

When Justinian succeeded to the throne in 527, two years after the marriage, Theodora was crowned augusta and became empress of the Eastern Roman Empire. According to Procopius, she shared in his decisions, plans and political strategies, and participated in state councils, and had great influence over him. Justinian once called her his "partner in my deliberations," in Novel 8.1 (AD 535), an anti-corruption legislation, where provincial officials had to take an oath to her as well as the emperor.

As Justinian’s partner, Theodora shared Justinian’s vision of the Byzantine Empire. First, his vision was straight-forward – there could be no Roman Empire that didn’t include Rome within its control. Since childhood, he was taught that there was one God and, therefore, one earthly empire. As the only Christian emperor and empress, it was their role to duplicate the heavenly structure on earth. Relatively youthful as an emperor and empress compared to recent predecessors, neither Justinian nor Theodora were content to maintain the status quo. Their goals and projects, whether building new churches and public buildings or raising troops for expansive military campaigns, required money. Justinian and his chief financial minister, John the Cappadocian, ruthlessly pursued additional taxes from the aristocracy who bristled at the lack of respect for their patrician status.

The Nika riots
Two major party factions were at odds before, during, and after Justinian and Theodora’s reign – the Blues and the Greens. Street violence between the parties was a regular event and when Justinian became emperor, he staked out a claim to drive the city to a more lawful and orderly community. These efforts were not perceived, however, as being even handed since both he and Theodora's favor were perceived as being aligned with the Blues (Justinian was believed to prefer the Blues due to their more moderate stances while Theodora’s family was abandoned by the Greens after her father’s death and consequently given support by the Blues as a child.) Consequently, the Greens felt isolated and frustrated. During a riot between the two factions in early January 532, the urban prefect Eudaemon arrested a group of both Green and Blue felons and convicted them of murder. They were sentenced to death but two of the felons, one Blue and one Green, survived the hanging when the scaffold collapsed. Both sides appealed for mercy at the hippodrome where the public was permitted to entreat the emperor on issues. As the chariot race card hit the second to last race for the day, the two factions (typically bitter rivals) united in a chant extolling the desire of both parties for mercy as a united front. Justinian recognized the danger of these factions uniting against Theodora and himself and retreated to the palace to plan their next actions.

The rioters set many public buildings on fire, and proclaimed a new emperor, Hypatius, the nephew of former emperor Anastasius I. Unable to control the mob, Justinian and his officials prepared to flee. According to Procopius, at a meeting of the government council, Theodora spoke out against leaving the palace and underlined the significance of someone who died as a ruler instead of living as an exile or in hiding, saying, "royal purple is the noblest shroud".

As the emperor and his counsellors were still preparing their project, Theodora reportedly interrupted them and claimed:

My lords, the present occasion is too serious to allow me to follow the convention that a woman should not speak in a man's council. Those whose interests are threatened by extreme danger should think only of the wisest course of action, not of conventions. In my opinion, flight is not the right course, even if it should bring us to safety. It is impossible for a person, having been born into this world, not to die; but for one who has reigned it is intolerable to be a fugitive. May I never be deprived of this purple robe, and may I never see the day when those who meet me do not call me empress. If you wish to save yourself, my lord, there is no difficulty. We are rich; over there is the sea, and yonder are the ships. Yet reflect for a moment whether, when you have once escaped to a place of security, you would not gladly exchange such safety for death.  As for me, I agree with the adage, that the royal purple is the noblest shroud.

Her determined speech convinced them all, including Justinian himself, who had been preparing to run. As a result, Justinian ordered his loyal troops, led by the officers, Belisarius and Mundus, to attack the demonstrators in the hippodrome, killing (according to Procopius) over 30,000 rebels. Other reports claimed greater numbers of victims as the distance from Constantinople increased; the scholar and historian Zachariah of Mytilene estimated the dead at more than eighty thousand.

Some scholars have interpreted Procopius' account as framed to impugn Justinian with the implication that he was more cowardly than his wife, and that the wording of her speech is devised by Procopius, changing the term "tyranny" from an ancient saying to "royal purple", possibly reflecting Procopius' desire to link Justinian to ancient tyrants.

Despite his claims that he was unwillingly named emperor by the mob, Hypatius was also put to death by Justinian. In one source, this came at Theodora's insistence.

Later life

Following the Nika revolt, Justinian and Theodora rebuilt Constantinople, including aqueducts, bridges and more than twenty-five churches, the most famous of which is Hagia Sophia. Justinian and Theodora also recognized the danger of allowing the level of dissent that had grown throughout the empire as a result of the actions of his reign which impacted the common people. Although they soon felt secure enough to reinstate the two ministers that were dismissed to appease the rebels (John the Cappadocian as financial minister and Tribonian as the primary legal minister), the couple monitored their administration’s actions more carefully to ensure that their activities were reasonable in their impact against the common citizenry. However, Justinian and Theodora retained a special distaste for the aristocrats that had the temerity to attempt to unseat them with one of their own. For the 19 senators that participated in the attempted Nika coup, they destroyed their estates and dumped their bodies in the ocean. Those who remained were left to deal with the aggressive taxation and other wealth capture schemes that John the Cappadocian hatched to continue funding Justinian and Theodora’s aggressive rebuilding plans.

Theodora was said to have been punctilious about court ceremony. According to Procopius, the imperial couple made all senators, including patricians, prostrate themselves before them whenever they entered their presence, and made it clear that their relations with the civil militia were those of masters and slaves:

They also supervised the magistrates, to reduce bureaucratic corruption.

The praetorian prefect Peter Barsymes was her close ally. John the Cappadocian, Justinian's chief tax collector, was identified as her enemy, because of his independent and great influence, and was brought down by a plot devised by Theodora and Antonina. She engaged in matchmaking, forming a network of alliances between the old powers, represented by emperor Anastasius' family and the pre-existing nobility, and the new, who were Justinian's and her relatives. According to Secret History, she attempted to marry her grandson Anastasius to Joannina, Belisarius' and Antonina's daughter and heiress, against her parents' will, although the couple would eventually fall in love with each other. The marriages of her sister Comito to general Sittas and her niece Sophia to Justinian's nephew Justin II, who would succeed to the throne, are suspected to have been engineered by Theodora.

She gave reception and sent letters and gifts to Persian and foreign ambassadors and the sister of Khosrow I.

She was involved in helping underprivileged women, sometimes "buying girls who had been sold into prostitution, freeing them, and providing for their future." She created a convent on the Asian side of the Dardanelles called the Metanoia (Repentance), where the ex-prostitutes could support themselves. Procopius' Secret History maintained that instead of preventing forced prostitution (as in Buildings 1.9.3ff), Theodora is said to have 'rounded up' 500 prostitutes, confining them to a convent. They sought to escape 'the unwelcome transformation' by leaping over the walls (SH 17). On the other hand, chronicler John Malalas who wrote positively about the court, declared she "freed the girls from the yoke of their wretched slavery." A century later, John of Nikiu, influenced by Malalas' positive portrayal, noted that Theodora "put an end to the prostitution of women, and gave orders for their expulsion from every place."

Justinian's legislations also expanded the rights of women in divorce and property ownership, instituted the death penalty for rape, forbade exposure of unwanted infants, gave mothers some guardianship rights over their children, and forbade the killing of a wife who committed adultery. Though her involvement in these legal reforms is not recorded, Procopius, in Wars, mentioned that she was naturally inclined to assist women in misfortune, and according to Secret History, she was accused of unfairly championing the wives' causes when their husbands charged them with adultery (SH 17). However, Procopius's claims of unfairness were exaggerated since the code of Justinian only allowed women seeking a divorce from their husbands due to either their arbitrary abuse or a wife catching their husband in obvious adultery. Regardless, either cause demanded that women seeking a divorce provide clear evidence of their claims.

Procopius describes Theodora’s worst crime as causing all women to “become morally depraved” because of her (and Justinian’s) actions that provided legal protections for women. As previously discussed, the actions of women in power were only acceptable from “masculine women” who weren’t perceived as “feminine”. In fact, Procopius has several types of people which he despises: common people who put on airs of aristocracy, women in power, and ultimately anyone who was closely associated with Justinian. Procopius had no use for describing Theodora as a “feminist” – the emancipation of women was completely evil in his mind.

Religious policy

Since Justinian was not the recognized head of any of the sects of the Christian church, his focus was on reducing and, where possible, eliminating friction between the various Christian sects and the Empire. There should be harmony between the church and the state. Consequently, his perspective was that as the Christian emperor, he should be in harmony with the head(s) of the church. Similarly, in spite of their differences (with Justinian a Chalcedonian and Theodora professing Miaphysite beliefs), Justinian worked to heal the schism that divided the Constantinople church from the Roman church and sought a united church that would “partner” with the one emperor (himself). The Emperor would manage human affairs and the priesthood would manage the divine affairs of God. Since the emperor was accountable to the law, Justinian made sure that the law recognized the emperor as being the law incarnate – with universal authority of divine origin. Consequently, he used the law to micromanage the implementation of religion through laws aimed at its very execution.

Theodora worked against her husband's support of Chalcedonian Christianity in the ongoing struggle for the predominance of each faction. As a result, she was accused of fostering heresy and thus undermined the unity of Christendom. However, Procopius and Evagrius Scholasticus suggested instead that Justinian and Theodora were merely pretending to be opposed to each other.

In spite of Justinian being Chalcedonian, Theodora founded a Miaphysite monastery in Sykae and provided shelter in the palace for Miaphysite leaders who faced opposition from the majority of Chalcedonian Christians, like Severus and Anthimus. Anthimus had been appointed Patriarch of Constantinople under her influence, and after the excommunication order he was hidden in Theodora's quarters for twelve years, until her death. When the Chalcedonian Patriarch Ephraim provoked a violent revolt in Antioch, eight Miaphysite bishops were invited to Constantinople and Theodora welcomed them and housed them in the Hormisdas Palace adjoining the Great Palace, which had been Justinian and Theodora's own dwelling before they became emperor and empress.

In Egypt, when Timothy III died, Theodora enlisted the help of Dioscoros, the Augustal Prefect, and Aristomachos the duke of Egypt, to facilitate the enthronement of a disciple of Severus, Theodosius, thereby outmaneuvering her husband, who had intended a Chalcedonian successor as patriarch. But Pope Theodosius I of Alexandria, even with the help of imperial troops, could not hold his ground in Alexandria against Justinian's Chalcedonian followers. When he was exiled by Justinian along with 300 Miaphysites to the fortress of Delcus in Thrace.

When Pope Silverius refused Theodora's demand that he remove the anathema of Pope Agapetus I from Patriarch Anthimus, she sent Belisarius instructions to find a pretext to remove Silverius. When this was accomplished, Pope Vigilius was appointed in his stead. She housed Anthimus secretly in her palace until her death in 548.

In Nobatae, south of Egypt, the inhabitants were converted to Miaphysite Christianity about 540. Justinian had been determined that they be converted to the Chalcedonian faith and Theodora equally determined that they should be Miaphysites. Justinian made arrangements for Chalcedonian missionaries from Thebaid to go with presents to Silko, the king of the Nobatae. But on hearing this, Theodora prepared her own missionaries and wrote to the duke of Thebaid that he should delay her husband's embassy, so that the Miaphysite missionaries should arrive first. The duke was canny enough to thwart the easygoing Justinian instead of the unforgiving Theodora. He saw to it that the Chalcedonian missionaries were delayed. When they eventually reached Silko, they were sent away, for the Nobatae had already adopted the Miaphysite creed of Theodosius.

Death
Theodora's death is recorded by Victor of Tonnena, with the cause uncertain but the Greek terms used are often translated as "cancer". The date was 28 June 548 at the age of 48, although other sources report that she died at 51. Later accounts frequently attribute the death to specifically breast cancer, although it was not identified as such in the original report, where the use of the term "cancer" probably referred to a more general "suppurating ulcer or malignant tumor".  Her body was buried in the Church of the Holy Apostles, in Constantinople. During a procession in 559, Justinian visited and lit candles for her tomb.

Historiography
The main historical sources for her life are the works of her contemporary Procopius. Procopius was a member of the staff of Belisarius, a field marshal for Justinian, who is perhaps the best-known officer of Justinian's officers largely because of Procopius's writings. The historian offered three different portrayals of the empress. The Wars of Justinian, largely completed in 545, paints a picture of a courageous and influential empress who saved the throne for Justinian.

Later, he wrote the Secret History. The work has sometimes been interpreted as representing a deep disillusionment with the emperor Justinian, the empress, and even his patron Belisarius. Justinian is depicted as cruel, venal, prodigal, demonic and incompetent; as for Theodora, the reader is given a detailed portrayal of vulgarity and rape, combined with shrewish and calculating mean-spiritedness.  Alternatively, scholars versed in political rhetoric of the era have viewed these statements from the Secret History as formulaic expressions within the tradition of invective.

Procopius' Buildings of Justinian, written probably after Secret History, is a panegyric which paints Justinian and Theodora as a pious couple and presents particularly flattering portrayals of them. Besides her piety, her beauty is praised within the conventional language of the text's rhetorical form. Although Theodora was dead when this work was published, Justinian was alive, and perhaps commissioned the work.

Her contemporary John of Ephesus writes about Theodora in his Lives of the Eastern Saints and mentions an illegitimate daughter. Theophanes the Confessor mentions some familial relations of Theodora to figures not mentioned by Procopius. Victor Tonnennensis notes her familial relation to the next empress, Sophia.

Michael the Syrian, the Chronicle of 1234 and Bar-Hebraeus place her origin in the city of Daman, near Kallinikos, Syria. They make an alternate account compared to Procopius by making Theodora the daughter of a priest, trained in the pious practices of Miaphysitism since birth. These are late Miaphysite sources and record her depiction among members of their creed. The Miaphysites have a tendency to regard Theodora as one of their own. Their account is also an alternative to what is told by the contemporary John of Ephesus. Many modern scholars prefer Procopius' account.

Critiques of Procopius

Numerous historians have emerged in recent decades pointing out that Procopius is not necessarily a reliable source on which to base our common understanding of Theodora and her historical impact.

Procopius was believed to be aligned with many of the senatorial rank that disagreed with the changes and policies that Justinian and Theodora imposed upon the empire. Procopius asserts in the Secret History (12.12-14) that many in the senatorial class were being "strangled" by tax collectors due to Justinian's (and Theodora's) policy of collecting and retaining the attractive properties and furniture of the wealthy, while "generously" giving back properties which had high taxes to their original owners. At one point, Procopius even compares Justinian's rule to the bubonic plague (6.22-23), arguing that the plague was a better option, since half the population escaped unscathed - unlike the impact of Justinian's rule.

In the Secret History, Procopius criticizes Justinian's and Theodora's rule as the antithesis of the rule of "good" emperors and empresses. However, his portrayal of their emotional balance and power is significantly different. Justinian was even of temperament, "approachable and kindly" – even while ordering the confiscation of people's property or their destruction. Conversely, Theodora was described as irrational and driven by her anger, often by minor affronts or insults. For example, Procopius describes two separate incidents where she accuses men of having sexual relations with other men publicly in the judicial system. This was considered an inappropriate forum for persons of standing and, in Procopius's narrative, unappreciated by the people of Constantinople. When one of the accusations is ruled as unsubstantiated, Procopius writes that the entire city celebrated.

One researcher suggested that Procopius’s writings in the Secret History amount to an apocryphal tale in the dangers of “the rule of women”. Procopius’s perspective as a conservative intellectual was that women, with their wily vices, served to vanquish men’s otherwise virtuous leadership instincts. Procopius details two examples of Theodora’s engagement in the Byzantine Empire’s foreign policy that supports his perspective. First, Theodora is quoted in a letter to the Persian ambassador declaring that Emperor Justinian would do nothing without her consent. The Persian king used this as an example to his nobles of a failed state since no “real state could exist that was governed by a woman.” Similarly, the Gothic king Theodahad expressed in a letter to Theodora that confirmed that “you exhort me to bring first to your attention anything I decide to ask from the triumphal prince, your husband.” Even the Emperor himself is quoted before issuing a decree that he had discussed it with “our most august consort whom God has given us.” All of these examples offend Procopius’s sense of propriety. It wasn’t the fact that women couldn’t lead an empire – Procopius believed that only women demonstrating masculine virtues and strengths were appropriate as leaders. The strength of Theodora was not hers; it was the lack of strength demonstrated by Justinian that created the impression of strength by Theodora.

The definition of “feminine” behavior in the sixth century as used by Procopius is not the way in which modern writers would use it. “Feminine” behavior in the sixth century would be described as “intriguing”, “interfering”, and the like according to researcher Averil Cameron. Procopius found Theodora’s efforts to assist “repentant” prostitutes as less the actions of a benefactress, but instead her further attempts to interfere with the status quo which he found objectionable. This is also why he includes her speech during the Nika insurrection where she interferes with the actions of the men as they contemplate escaping the rioters. Procopius’s intent in describing that scene is to demonstrate that Theodora is unable to stay in her appropriate role. At his core, he was a preserver of the social order. Dr. Henning Börm, Chair of Ancient History at the University of Rostock in Germany, described it to Michael Edward Stewart as a “social hierarchy: people stood over animals, freeman stood over slaves, men stood over eunuchs, and men stood over women. Whenever Procopius denounces the alleged breach of these rules, he simply follows the rules of historiography."

Although Procopius as a contemporary historian demonstrates areas of clear bias, his aggrandized tales and retelling of salacious rumors (compared alongside other historians of the era) provide a glimpse into the changing values and norms of the time period, rather than a straightforward biographical study of Theodora's life and character. For example, the portrayal of Justinian and Theodora as demons in the Secret History reflects a common belief system held by the people during this time period. Events unexplainable by rational means were either a product of divine providence or the result of evil demons. When Procopius was unable to explain the actions of the Emperor and Empress according to his beliefs, he fell back on the principle of outside influences being the only likely explanation.

Perhaps describing Procopius as a historian is incorrect from the perspective of Averil Cameron, a researcher. In her view, Procopius is more aptly described as a reporter. He focuses on events and their details far more than analyzing motives and causes. Consequently, his portrayals lack nuance; they harshly describe events from a palette of black and white. His rigidity and inability to embrace change make him a suspect voice when pursuing a deeper understanding of how and why events occurred as they did. This may also explain why Procopius in his writings is significantly different in his characterization of day to day life compared to the accounts of other contemporary authors. While other writers describe the daily theological battles between the different Christian sects and the efforts of the government to align and subdue them, Procopius remains almost silent on these topics. He maintains an intense and political focus on his writing which precludes a balanced and holistic perspective. This intensity results in his portrayal of Justinian and Theodora as near caricatures. By over exaggerating their faults and ignoring their successes, the reader is compelled to see them as villain or hero.

Lasting influence 
The Miaphysites believed her influence on Justinian to be so strong that after her death, when he worked to bring harmony between the Miaphysites and the Chalcedonian Christians in the Empire and kept his promise to protect her little community of Miaphysite refugees in the Hormisdas Palace, the Miaphysites suspected Theodora's memory to be the driving factor.
Theodora provided much political support for the ministry of Jacob Baradaeus, and apparently personal friendship as well. Diehl attributes the modern existence of Jacobite Christianity equally to Baradaeus and to Theodora.

Olbia in Cyrenaica renamed itself Theodorias after Theodora. (It was a common event that ancient cities renamed themselves to honor an emperor or empress.) The city, now called Qasr Libya, is known for its splendid sixth-century mosaics.

Theodora and Justinian are represented in mosaics that exist to this day in the Basilica of San Vitale of Ravenna, Italy, which were completed a year before her death after 547 when the Byzantines retook the city. She is depicted in full imperial garb, endowed with jewels befitting her role as empress. Her cloak is embroidered with imagery of the three kings bearing their gifts for the Christ child, symbolizing a connection with her and Justinian bringing gifts to the church. In this case, she is shown bearing a communion chalice. In addition to the religious tone of these mosaics, other mosaics depict Theodora and Justinian receiving the vanquished kings of the Goths and Vandals as prisoners of war, surrounded by the cheering Roman Senate. The Emperor and Empress are recognized in both victory and in generosity in these large-scale public works.

Media portrayals

Art 
 The artwork The Dinner Party features a place setting for Theodora.
 The jewellery line Nika of Sassi Fine Jewellery is inspired by a jewel that might have belonged to Theodora and the event of the attack of the royal palace in 532

Books 
 Count Belisarius. Robert Graves (1938). A historical novel by the author of I, Claudius which features Theodora as a character.
 In one of the episodes of Hendrik Willem van Loon's 1942 fantasy novel Van Loon's Lives
 Theodora and the Emperor. Harold Lamb (1952). Historical novel that focuses on the life of Theodora, her relationship with Justinian, and her many accomplishments as Empress.
 The Glittering Horn: Secret Memoirs of the Court of Justinian. Pierson Dixon (1958). A historical novel about the court of Justinian with Theodora playing a central part.
 The Female. Paul Wellman (1953). The rise of Theodora from prostitute to empress.
 Theodora von Byzanz. Ein Mädchen aus dem Volk wird Kaiserin (1957). Friedhelm Volbach (under the pseudonym Rudolph Fürstenberg). German historical novel.
 The Bearkeeper's Daughter. Gillian Bradshaw (1987). A young man out of Theodora's past arrives at the palace, seeking the truth of certain statements made to him by his dying father.
 The Sarantine Mosaic. Guy Gavriel Kay (1998). Historical fantasy modelled on the Byzantium empire and the story of Justinian and Theodora.
 In the historical mystery novel One for Sorrow by Mary Reed/Eric Mayer, Theodora is one of the suspects in the murder case investigated by John, the Lord Chamberlain.
 Immortal. Christopher Golden and Nancy Holden (1999). A Buffy the Vampire Slayer novel which mentions Theodora working with the vampire Veronique towards immortality in 543 AD.
 Theodora: Actress, Empress, Whore. Stella Duffy (2010). A historical novel, about Theodora's years up until she became empress.
 The Purple Shroud. Stella Duffy (2012). A historical novel, about Theodora's years as empress.
 The Secret History Stephanie Thornton (2020). Theodora's life story rendered into a novel.

Film 

 Teodora imperatrice di Bisanzio (Short, 1909) aka Theodora, Empress of Byzantium. Directed by Ernesto Maria Pasquali.
 Teodora, imperatrice di Bisanzio (1954) aka Theodora, Slave Empress.  Directed by Riccardo Freda. Theodora played by Gianna Maria Canale.
 Kampf um Rom (1968) directed by Robert Siodmak, Sergiu Nicolaescu and Andrew Marton. In this movie she is played by Sylva Koscina.
 Primary Russia (1985) directed by Gennady Vasilyev. Theodora played by Margarita Terekhova

Theater 
 Theodora, a Drama (1884), a play by Victorien Sardou.

Video games 
 Theodora is the leader for the Byzantines in the video game Civilization III, Civilization V in its Gods and Kings expansion, and an alternate leader in Civilization VIs Leader Pass.
 Theodora gives missions to Belisarius, the main character in the Last Roman DLC for Total War: Attila.
 Theodora is a playable character in the Mobile/PC Game Rise of Kingdoms.

Music 
 The progressive rock band Big Big Train sings of Theodora herself, and the mosaics of Theodora and Justinian in Ravenna, in the song "Theodora in Green and Gold" on their 2019 album Grand Tour.
George Frideric Handel's oratorio "Theodora" does not refer to the empress.

Citations

General and cited references 
 Hans-Georg Beck: Kaiserin Theodora und Prokop: der Historiker und sein Opfer. Munich 1986, .
 Henning Börm: Procopius, his predecessors, and the genesis of the Anecdota: Antimonarchic discourse in late antique historiography. In: Henning Börm (ed.): Antimonarchic discourse in Antiquity. Stuttgart 2015, pp. 305–346.
 
 James A. S. Evans: The empress Theodora. Partner of Justinian. Austin 2002.
 James A. S. Evans: The Power Game in Byzantium. Antonina and the Empress Theodora. London 2011.
 Lynda Garland: Byzantine Empresses: Women and Power in Byzantium, AD 527–1204. London 1999.
 Hartmut Leppin: Theodora und Iustinian. In: Hildegard Temporini-Gräfin Vitzthum (ed.): Die Kaiserinnen Roms. Von Livia bis Theodora. Munich 2002, pp. 437–481.
 Mischa Meier: "Zur Funktion der Theodora-Rede im Geschichtswerk Prokops (BP 1,24,33-37)", Rheinisches Museum für Philologie 147 (2004), pp. 88ff.
 David Potter: Theodora. Actress, Empress, Saint. Oxford 2015, .
 
 Procopius, The Secret History at the Internet Medieval Sourcebook
 Procopius, The Secret History at LacusCurtius

External links 

 World History Encyclopedia – Empress Theodora
 Gibbons' The History of the Decline and Fall of the Roman Empire: The Fall of the Roman Empire in the East
 Discussion of mosaics by Janina Ramirez and Bettany Hughes: Art Detective Podcast, 21 December 2016

500 births
548 deaths
6th-century Byzantine empresses
6th-century Christian saints
Ancient Roman dancers
Augustae
Burials at the Church of the Holy Apostles
Byzantine courtesans
Christian royal saints
Deaths from cancer
Feminism and history
Greek Cypriot people
Justinian I
Justinian dynasty
Medieval actors